Eleftherios "Lefteris" Topalidis (born 2 September 1986) is a Greek footballer who currently plays as a goalkeeper for Anagennisi Epanomi in the Football League. During his career, he has also played for Orfeas Eleftheroupoli, PAONE, Doxa Drama, Zakynthos and Chalkida.

Club career 
Born in Kavala, Topalidis began playing football in the regional leagues with local club Orfeas Eleftheroupoli and joined Gamma Ethniki side PAONE in 2006. After two seasons with PAONE, he signed with Doxa Drama for three seasons, celebrating two promotions with the club – he helped the club reach the 2010–11 Football League promotion play-offs, where they lost to OFI Crete, but Doxa Drama managed to get promoted to the Superleague after all due to the Koriopolis scandal. Topalidis however did not stay at Drama and moved to Greek Football League 2 side Zakynthos for half a year and in February 2012 he signed for Chalkida in the Delta Ethniki. In July 2012 he joined Anagennisi Epanomi in the Greek Football League.

References

External links
Profile at Onsports.gr 
Profile at Myplayer.gr 

1986 births
Living people
Greek footballers
Doxa Drama F.C. players
Association football goalkeepers
Footballers from Kavala